In mathematics, a quasifield is an algebraic structure  where + and  are binary operations on Q, much like a division ring, but with some weaker conditions. All division rings, and thus all fields, are quasifields.

Definition

  is a group
  is a loop, where 
  (left distributivity)
  has exactly one solution 

Strictly speaking, this is the definition of a left quasifield. A right quasifield is similarly defined, but satisfies right distributivity instead. A quasifield satisfying both distributive laws is called a semifield, in the sense in which the term is used in projective geometry.

Although not assumed, one can prove that the axioms imply that the additive group  is abelian. Thus, when referring to an abelian quasifield, one means that  is abelian.

Kernel

The kernel K of a quasifield Q is the set of all elements c such that :
 
 

One can now make a vector space of Q over K, with the following scalar multiplication :

As a finite division ring is a finite field by Wedderburn's theorem, the order of the kernel of a finite quasifield is a prime power. The vector space construction implies that the order of any finite quasifield must also be a prime power.

Examples
All division rings, and thus all fields, are quasifields. 

A (right) near-field that is a (right) quasifield is called a "planar near-field".

The smallest quasifields are abelian and unique. They are the finite fields of orders up to and including eight.

Projective planes

Given a quasifield , we define a ternary map  by

One can then verify that  satisfies the axioms of a planar ternary ring. The projective planes constructed this way are characterized as follows;
A projective plane is a translation plane with respect to the line at infinity if and only if any (or all) of its associated planar ternary rings are right quasifields. It is called a shear plane if any (or all) of its ternary rings are left quasifields.

The plane does not uniquely determine the ring; all 4 nonabelian quasifields of order 9 are ternary rings for the unique non-Desarguesian translation plane of order 9. These differ in the fundamental quadrilateral used to construct the plane (see Weibel 2007).

History

Quasifields were called "Veblen-Wedderburn systems" in the literature before 1975, since they were first studied in the
1907 paper (Veblen-Wedderburn 1907) by O. Veblen and J. Wedderburn.

References
 .

See also 

 Near-field
 Semifield
 Alternative division ring
 Hall systems (Hall planes)
 Moufang plane

External links 

 Quasifields by Hauke Klein.

Non-associative algebra
Projective geometry
Field (mathematics)